This Ole House is a 1980/1981 album by Welsh rock and roll singer Shakin' Stevens. The album was originally released in October 1980 under the name Marie, Marie but failed to chart. When single "This Ole House" reached No. 1 in the UK Singles Chart the album was re-issued in March 1981 with the new title and song added, peaking at No. 2 in the UK Albums Chart.

Background 
The album was originally released in October 1980 on the back of his first top 20 hit "Marie, Marie". However, a later single "This Ole House" became a much bigger hit, peaking at No. 1 for three weeks in March 1981. The album was quickly re-issued with the same cover but now under the title This Ole House. It peaked at No. 2, giving Stevens' his first top ten album. It spent 28 weeks on the UK Charts and was certified Gold by the BPI. The album also contains earlier singles "Hey Mae" and "Shooting Gallery".

"Marie, Marie" is a song by Dave Alvin and his band The Blasters, released on their 1980 album American Music.

"This Ole House" replaced the song "Two Hearts" (later titled "Two Hearts Two Kisses") from the original album. The album retained most of the same musicians from the Take One! (1980) album, with the addition of Welsh guitarist (and ex-member of Stevens' previous backing group the Sunsets) Mickey Gee.

The album was re-issued on CD for the first time in 2009 as part of The Epic Masters boxset.

track listing

Personnel 
 Shakin' Stevens – vocals
 Albert Lee – lead guitar
 Eddie Jones – electric guitar
 Mickey Gee – lead guitar
 Roger McKew – rhythm guitar
 B.J. Cole – steel guitar
 Geraint Watkins – piano
 Stuart Colman – bass
 Howard Tibble – drums
 Tony Hall – tenor saxophone
 Sid Phillips – baritone saxophone

Production
 Aldo Bocca, Rod Houison - engineers
 Freya Miller - management
 Neill King, Nick Froome - assistants
 Simon Fowler - photography

Charts

Weekly charts

Year-end charts

Certifications and sales

References 

1980 albums
1981 albums
Epic Records albums
Shakin' Stevens albums